Adam Wolańczyk (9 May 1936 – 3 June 2022) was a Polish actor.

Biography
Wolańczyk graduated from the acting department of Łódź Film School in 1960. He appeared in Johnnie Waterman, directed by Jan Jakub Kolski, and Pan Tadeusz, directed by Andrzej Wajda. In 1989, he received the Silver Cross of Merit.

Adam Wolańczyk died on 3 June 2022 at the age of 86.

References

1936 births
2022 deaths
Polish male actors
Polish male stage actors
Polish male film actors
Łódź Film School alumni
People from Lubaczów County